The I Royal Bavarian Reserve Corps / I Bavarian RK was a corps level command of the Royal Bavarian Army, part of the German Army, in World War I.

Formation 
I Royal Bavarian Reserve Corps was formed on the outbreak of the war in August 1914 as part of the mobilisation of the Army.  It was initially commanded by General der Infanterie Karl von Fasbender, brought out of retirement.  It was still in existence at the end of the war in the 17th Army, Heeresgruppe Kronprinz Rupprecht on the Western Front.

Structure on formation 
On formation in August 1914, I Royal Bavarian Reserve Corps consisted of two divisions, made up of reserve units.  In general, Reserve Corps and Reserve Divisions were weaker than their active counterparts
Reserve Infantry Regiments did not always have three battalions nor necessarily contain a machine gun company
Reserve Jäger Battalions did not have a machine gun company on formation
Reserve Cavalry Regiments consisted of just three squadrons
Reserve Field Artillery Regiments usually consisted of two abteilungen of three batteries each
Corps Troops generally consisted of a Telephone Detachment and four sections of munition columns and trains 

In summary, I Royal Bavarian Reserve Corps mobilised with 25 infantry battalions, 5 machine gun companies (30 machine guns), 6 cavalry squadrons, 12 field artillery batteries (72 guns) and 3 pioneer companies.  5th Bavarian Reserve Division was formed mostly by units drawn from the III Bavarian Corps District.

Combat chronicle 
On mobilisation, I Royal Bavarian Reserve Corps was assigned to the predominantly Bavarian 6th Army forming part of the left wing of the forces for the Schlieffen Plan offensive in August 1914.

Commanders 
I Bavarian Reserve Corps had the following commanders during its existence:

See also 

Bavarian Army
German Army order of battle (1914)
German Army order of battle, Western Front (1918)

Notes

References

Bibliography 
 
 
 
 

Corps of Germany in World War I
Military units and formations of Bavaria
1914 establishments in Germany
1918 disestablishments in Germany
Military units and formations established in 1914
Military units and formations disestablished in 1918